Bologna Mazzini is a railway station in Bologna, Italy. The station opened in 2013 and is located on the Bologna–Florence railway. Train services are operated by Trenitalia Tper.

The station is managed by Rete Ferroviaria Italiana (RFI), a subsidiary of Ferrovie dello Stato Italiane (FSI), Italy's state-owned rail company.

Location
Bologna Mazzini railway station is situated east of the city centre, along the via Emilia.

History
The station was formally opened on 4 June 2013. Commercial service began on 9 June 2013.

Features
The station does not feature any building.

It consists of two tracks.

Train services

The station is served by the following service(s):

 Suburban services (Treno suburbano) on line S1B, Bologna - San Benedetto Val di Sambro

See also

 List of railway stations in Bologna
 List of railway stations in Emilia-Romagna
 Bologna metropolitan railway service

References 

Railway stations in Bologna
Railway stations opened in 2013